Kudipady, also called Pallataru-Kodipady or Kidippady, is a village in Puttur Taluk of Dakshina Kannada district, India. It is 6 km to the west of the larger town of Puttur and 4 km south of the town of Kabaka.  Mangalore, the regions chief port city, is a further 48 km to the north-west. The local economy is primarily agricultural, with most farms growing Areca nut cocoa, pepper, coconut, and bananas.

The majority of the population are Sunni-Muslim or Hindu, with a smaller population of Catholics. The main languages spoken are Malayalam, Tulu, Konkani, Kannada and Beary.

The village is famous for the Janardhana Temple.

References

Villages in Dakshina Kannada district